Baz Kia Gurab Rural District is a rural district (dehestan) in the Central District of Lahijan County, Gilan Province, Iran. At the 2006 census, its population was 15,029, in 4,430 families. The rural district has 21 villages.

References 

Rural Districts of Gilan Province
Lahijan County